Philip Morris Kedward (26 July 1909 – 3 September 1996) was an English first-class cricketer.

Kedward, who was born at Hull in July 1909, made a single appearance in first-class cricket for H. D. G. Leveson-Gower's XI against Oxford University at Reigate in 1935. Batting once in the match, he was dismissed without scoring in the HDG Leveson-Gower's XI first-innings by Tristan Ballance. He died in September 1996 at Willesborough, Kent.

References

External links

1909 births
1996 deaths
Cricketers from Kingston upon Hull
English cricketers
H. D. G. Leveson Gower's XI cricketers
People from Willesborough